To Rent Furnished is a 1915 American short film directed by  B. Reeves Eason.

Cast
Bessie Banks
 Harry Edmondson
 Vivian Rich
 Walter Spencer

External links

1915 films
1915 short films
American silent short films
American black-and-white films
Films directed by B. Reeves Eason
1910s American films